The 2002–03 Detroit Red Wings season was the 77th National Hockey League season in Detroit, Michigan.  The Red Wings scored 110 points, winning the Central Division, but just one point behind the Dallas Stars for the Western Conference's first seed.

Coming off their latest Stanley Cup victory, the Red Wings started looking towards the future. Dominik Hasek and Scotty Bowman had retired over the summer and captain Steve Yzerman was out for the first 66 games of the regular season. The weight of the team fell on Sergei Fedorov and veteran Brett Hull, who helped the Red Wings score the most goals of any team in the regular season. As newly acquired goaltender Curtis Joseph held steady in net, two more pieces of the Stanley Cup team would be traded over the course of the year. Maxim Kuznetsov and Sean Avery left in a trade for the Los Angeles Kings' Mathieu Schneider right before the trade deadline in an effort to push the Wings towards the playoffs. However, the moves did not come to complete fruition, as the Wings met the Mighty Ducks of Anaheim in the first round and shocked everyone by being swept in four games.

Three Red Wings were named to the roster for the 2003 All-Star Game: defenceman Nicklas Lidstrom, center Sergei Fedorov and head coach Dave Lewis. It was Lidstrom's seventh appearance at the All-Star Game, Fedorov's sixth and Lewis's first appearance as a coach.

The Red Wings sold out all 41 home games in 2002–03 as 20,058 fans packed Joe Louis Arena for every regular season and playoff game played in Detroit.

Regular season
The Red Wings led the NHL in scoring during the regular season, with 269 goals for, and power-play percentage, at 23.82% (76 for 319). They also tied the Los Angeles Kings, New Jersey Devils and Washington Capitals for fewest short-handed goals allowed, with just four.

Season standings

Playoffs
The Detroit Red Wings ended the 2002–03 regular season as the Western Conference's second seed and played Anaheim in the first round. Anaheim upset Detroit in a four-game sweep. The Mighty Ducks would advance and reach the Stanley Cup Finals, losing in Game 7 to the New Jersey Devils.

Schedule and results

Regular season

|- align="center" bgcolor="#bbffbb" 
| 1 || October 10 || Detroit || 6 – 3 || San Jose || || Joseph || 17,496 || 1–0–0–0 || 2 || 
|- align="center" bgcolor="#ffbbbb" 
| 2 || October 12 || Detroit || 2 – 3 || Los Angeles || || Joseph || 18,177 || 1–1–0–0 || 2 || 
|- align="center" bgcolor="#bbffbb" 
| 3 || October 13 || Detroit || 4 – 2 || Anaheim || || Legace || 17,174 || 2–1–0–0 || 4 || 
|- align="center" bgcolor="#ffbbbb" 
| 4 || October 17 || Montreal || 3 – 2 || Detroit || || Joseph || 20,058 || 2–2–0–0 || 4 || 
|- align="center" bgcolor="#bbffbb"  
| 5 || October 19 || Detroit || 5 – 3 || Minnesota || || Joseph || 19,344 || 3–2–0–0 || 6 || 
|- align="center" bgcolor="#bbffbb" 
| 6 || October 21 || Calgary || 0 – 4 || Detroit || || Joseph || 20,058 || 4–2–0–0 || 8 || 
|- align="center" bgcolor="#ffffbb" 
| 7 || October 23 || Los Angeles || 3 – 3 || Detroit || OT || Joseph || 20,058 || 4–2–1–0 || 9 || 
|- align="center" bgcolor="#bbffbb"  
| 8 || October 25 || Pittsburgh || 3 – 7 || Detroit || || Legace || 20,058 || 5–2–1–0 || 11 || 
|- align="center" bgcolor="#ffbbbb"  
| 9 || October 26 || Detroit || 1 – 3 || Nashville || || Joseph || 17,113 || 5–3–1–0 || 11 || 
|- align="center" bgcolor="#bbffbb"  
| 10 || October 29 || San Jose || 2 – 3 || Detroit || || Joseph || 20,058 || 6–3–1–0 || 13 || 
|-

|- align="center" bgcolor="#ffbbbb" 
| 11 || November 2 || Detroit || 2 – 5 || Ottawa || || Joseph || 18,210 || 6–4–1–0 || 13 || 
|- align="center" bgcolor="#ffffbb" 
| 12 || November 3 || Dallas || 3 – 3 || Detroit || OT || Joseph || 20,058 || 6–4–2–0 || 14 || 
|- align="center" bgcolor="#ffbbbb" 
| 13 || November 5 || Chicago || 2 – 0 || Detroit || || Legace || 20,058 || 6–5–2–0 || 14 || 
|- align="center" bgcolor="#bbffbb"
| 14 || November 7 || Boston || 1 – 2 || Detroit || OT || Legace || 20,058 || 7–5–2–0 || 16 || 
|- align="center" bgcolor="#bbffbb" 
| 15 || November 12 || Nashville || 1 – 4 || Detroit || || Joseph || 20,058 || 8–5–2–0 || 18 || 
|- align="center" bgcolor="#bbffbb" 
| 16 || November 15 || Anaheim || 1 – 2 || Detroit || OT || Joseph || 20,058 || 9–5–2–0 || 20 || 
|- align="center" bgcolor="#bbffbb" 
| 17 || November 16 || Detroit || 2 – 1 || Toronto || || Legace || 19,110 || 10–5–2–0 || 22 || 
|- align="center" bgcolor="#bbffbb"
| 18 || November 19 || Detroit || 5 – 0 || Calgary || || Joseph || 16,061 || 11–5–2–0 || 24 || 
|- align="center" bgcolor="#ffbbbb"
| 19 || November 22 || Detroit || 1 – 4 || Vancouver || || Legace || 18,422 || 11–6–2–0 || 24 || 
|- align="center" bgcolor="#ffffbb"
| 20 || November 23 || Detroit || 1 – 1 || Edmonton || OT || Joseph || 16,839 || 11–6–3–0 || 25 || 
|- align="center" 
| 21 || November 25 || Edmonton || 5 – 4 || Detroit || OT || Legace || 20,058 || 11–6–3–1 || 26 || 
|- align="center" bgcolor="#bbffbb" 
| 22 || November 27 || New Jersey || 2 – 3 || Detroit || OT || Joseph || 20,058 || 12–6–3–1 || 28 || 
|- align="center" bgcolor="#ffbbbb" 
| 23 || November 29 || Detroit  || 4 – 6 || Carolina || || Joseph || 20,066 || 12–7–3–1 || 28 || 
|-

|- align="center" bgcolor="#bbffbb" 
| 24 || December 1 || Calgary || 2 – 4 || Detroit || || Joseph || 20,066 || 13–7–3–1 || 30 || 
|- align="center" bgcolor="#bbffbb" 
| 25 || December 3 || Anaheim || 1 – 2 || Detroit || || Joseph || 18,504 || 14–7–3–1 || 32 || 
|- align="center" bgcolor="#bbffbb" 
| 26 || December 5 || Detroit || 5 – 3 || Phoenix || || Joseph || 15,189 || 15–7–3–1 || 34 || 
|- align="center" bgcolor="#ffffbb" 
| 27 || December 6 || Detroit || 3 – 3 || Dallas || OT || Joseph || 18,532 || 15–7–4–1 || 35 || 
|- align="center" bgcolor="#bbffbb" 
| 28 || December 8 || St. Louis || 3 – 4 || Detroit || OT || Joseph || 20,058 || 16–7–4–1 || 37 || 
|- align="center" bgcolor="#ffbbbb"
| 29 || December 12 || Minnesota || 3 – 2 || Detroit || || Joseph || 20,058 || 16–8–4–1 || 37 || 
|- align="center" bgcolor="#bbffbb"
| 30 || December 14 || Columbus || 4 – 6 || Detroit || || Joseph || 20,058 || 17–8–4–1 || 39 || 
|- align="center" bgcolor="#ffffbb" 
| 31 || December 17 || Detroit || 2 – 2 || NY Islanders || OT || Legace || 14,884 || 17–8–5–1 || 40 || 
|- align="center" bgcolor="#ffffbb" 
| 32 || December 19 || Dallas || 1 – 1 || Detroit || OT || Legace || 20,058 || 17–8–6–1 || 41 || 
|- align="center" bgcolor="#bbffbb" 
| 33 || December 21 || NY Rangers || 2 – 3 || Detroit || || Legace || 20,058 || 18–8–6–1 || 43 || 
|- align="center" bgcolor="#bbffbb" 
| 34 || December 23 || Detroit || 1 – 0 || Columbus || || Joseph || 18,136 || 19–8–6–1 || 45 || 
|- align="center" bgcolor="#bbffbb"
| 35 || December 26 || Columbus || 2 – 4 || Detroit || || Joseph || 20,058 || 20–8–6–1 || 47 || 
|- align="center" bgcolor="#bbffbb"
| 36 || December 28 || Detroit || 4 – 2 || Nashville || || Legace || 17,113 || 21–8–6–1 || 49 || 
|- align="center" bgcolor="#ffffbb"
| 37 || December 29 || Detroit || 2 – 2 || Dallas || OT || Joseph || 18,532 || 21–8–7–1 || 50 || 
|- align="center" bgcolor="#bbffbb"
| 38 || December 31 || St. Louis || 1 – 5 || Detroit || || Joseph || 20,058 || 22–8–7–1 || 52 || 
|-

|- align="center" bgcolor="#ffbbbb" 
| 39 || January 3 || Phoenix || 4 – 1 || Detroit || || Joseph || 20,058 || 22–9–7–1 || 52 || 
|- align="center" bgcolor="#bbffbb" 
| 40 || January 5 || Detroit || 4 – 3 || Chicago || OT || Joseph || 21,295 || 23–9–7–1 || 54 || 
|- align="center" bgcolor="#ffbbbb"
| 41 || January 7 || Detroit || 0 – 1 || Tampa Bay || || Joseph  || 19,941 || 23–10–7–1 || 54 || 
|- align="center" bgcolor="#bbffbb"
| 42 || January 8 || Detroit || 2 – 1 || Florida || OT || Legace ||19,250 || 24–10–7–1 || 56 || 
|- align="center" bgcolor="#ffbbbb"
| 43 || January 11 || Detroit || 2 – 3 || Philadelphia || || Joseph || 19,654 || 24–11–7–1 || 56 || 
|- align="center" bgcolor="#bbffbb" 
| 44 || January 13 || Chicago || 4 – 5 || Detroit || OT || Joseph || 20,058 || 25–11–7–1 || 58 || 
|- align="center" bgcolor="#ffbbbb" 
| 45 || January 15 || Detroit || 1 – 4 || Chicago || || Legace || 21,391 || 25–12–7–1 || 58 || 
|- align="center" bgcolor="#bbffbb" 
| 46 || January 16 || Detroit || 2 – 4 || Colorado || || Joseph || 18,007 || 26–12–7–1 || 60 || 
|- align="center" bgcolor="#ffbbbb" 
| 47 || January 19 || Vancouver || 4 – 1 || Detroit || || Joseph || 20,058 || 26–13–7–1 || 60 || 
|- align="center" 
| 48 || January 22 || Detroit || 3 – 4 || Edmonton || OT || Joseph || 16,839 || 26–13–7–2 || 61 || 
|- align="center" bgcolor="#bbffbb" 
| 49 || January 24 || Detroit || 5 – 2 || Vancouver || || Legace || 18,422 || 27–13–7–2 || 63 || 
|- align="center" bgcolor="#ffbbbb"
| 50 || January 25 || Detroit || 1 – 4 || Calgary || || Joseph || 18,028 || 27–14–7–2 || 63 || 
|- align="center" bgcolor="#ffbbbb"
| 51 || January 28 || Detroit || 0 – 1 || New Jersey || || Legace || 16,453 || 27–15–7–2 || 63 || 
|- align="center" bgcolor="#ffffbb"
| 52 || January 30 || Florida || 2 – 2 || Detroit || OT || Legace || 20,058 || 27–15–8–2 || 64 || 
|-

|- align="center" bgcolor="#ffffbb" 
| 53 || February 4 || Nashville || 5 – 5 || Detroit || OT || Joseph || 20,058 || 27–15–9–2 || 65 || 
|- align="center" bgcolor="#ffbbbb" 
| 54 || February 6 || Colorado || 1 – 0 || Detroit || || Joseph || 20,058 || 27–16–9–2 || 65 || 
|- align="center" bgcolor="#ffbbbb" 
| 55 || February 8 || Detroit || 3 – 5 || Colorado || || Joseph || 18,007 || 27–17–9–2 || 65 || 
|- align="center" bgcolor="#bbffbb"  
| 56 || February 10 || San Jose || 5 – 4 || Detroit || || Legace || 20,058 || 28–17–9–2 || 67 || 
|- align="center" bgcolor="#bbffbb" 
| 57 || February 13 || Buffalo || 2 – 4 || Detroit || || Joseph || 20,058 || 29–17–9–2 || 69 || 
|- align="center" bgcolor="#bbffbb"  
| 58 || February 15 || Detroit || 6 – 2 || Atlanta || || Joseph || 18,857 || 30–17–9–2 || 71 || 
|- align="center"  
| 59 || February 18 || Vancouver || 4 – 3 || Detroit || OT || Joseph || 20,058 || 30–17–9–3 || 72 || 
|- align="center" bgcolor="#bbffbb" 
| 60 || February 20 || Edmonton || 2 – 6 || Detroit || || Joseph || 20,058 || 31–17–9–3 || 74 || 
|- align="center" bgcolor="#bbffbb"  
| 61 || February 22 || Detroit || 5 – 1 || Washington || || Joseph || 18,277 || 32–17–9–3 || 76 || 
|- align="center" bgcolor="#bbffbb" 
| 62 || February 24 || Los Angeles || 4 – 5 || Detroit || || Legace || 20,058 || 33–17–9–3 || 78 || 
|- align="center" bgcolor="#bbffbb" 
| 63 || February 27 || Toronto || 2 – 7 || Detroit || || Joseph || 20,058 || 34–17–9–3 || 80 || 
|-

|- align="center" bgcolor="#bbffbb"
| 64 || March 2 || Phoenix || 2 – 5 || Detroit || || Joseph || 20,058 || 35–17–9–3 || 82 || 
|- align="center" bgcolor="#bbffbb" 
| 65 || March 3 || Detroit || 3 – 2 || Columbus || || Legace || 18,136 || 36–17–9–3 || 84 || 
|- align="center" bgcolor="#bbffbb"
| 66 || March 5 || Tampa Bay || 2 – 3 || Detroit || || Joseph || 20,058 || 37–17–9–3 || 86 || 
|- align="center" bgcolor="#bbffbb"
| 67 || March 7 || St. Louis || 2 – 7 || Detroit || || Joseph || 20,058 || 38–17–9–3 || 88 || 
|- align="center" bgcolor="#ffbbbb"
| 68 || March 9 || Detroit || 1 – 4 || Anaheim || || Legace || 17,174 || 38–18–9–3 || 88 || 
|- align="center" bgcolor="#bbffbb"
| 69 || March 10 || Detroit || 2 – 3 || Los Angeles || || Legace || 18,344 || 39–18–9–3 || 90 || 
|- align="center" bgcolor="#bbffbb"
| 70 || March 12 || Detroit || 2 – 3 || Phoenix || || Joseph || 15,813 || 40–18–9–3 || 92 || 
|- align="center" bgcolor="#bbffbb"
| 71 || March 15 || Colorado || 3 – 5 || Detroit || || Joseph || 20,058 || 41–18–9–3 || 94 || 
|- align="center" bgcolor="#bbffbb"
| 72 || March 16 || Ottawa || 2 – 6 || Detroit || || Joseph || 20,058 || 42–18–9–3 || 96 || 
|- align="center" bgcolor="#bbffbb"
| 73 || March 18 || Detroit || 5 – 1 || Pittsburgh || || Legace || 13,840 || 43–18–9–3 || 98 || 
|- align="center" bgcolor="#bbffbb"
| 74 || March 22 || Detroit || 4 – 2 || St. Louis || || Joseph || 19,995 || 44–18–9–3 || 100 || 
|- align="center" bgcolor="#ffbbbb"
| 75 || March 23 || Detroit || 0 – 4 || Minnesota || || Legace || 18,568 || 44–19–9–3 || 100 || 
|- align="center" bgcolor="#bbffbb"
| 76 || March 25 || Minnesota || 0 – 4 || Detroit || || Joseph || 20,058 || 45–19–9–3 || 102 || 
|- align="center" bgcolor="#ffbbbb"
| 77 || March 27 || Detroit || 0 – 3 || San Jose || || Joseph || 17,496 || 45–20–9–3 || 102 || 
|- align="center" bgcolor="#bbffbb"
| 78 || March 29 || Detroit || 6 – 2 || St. Louis || || Legace || 19,951 || 46–20–9–3 || 104 || 
|- align="center" bgcolor="#bbffbb"
| 79 || March 31 || Nashville || 0 – 3 || Detroit || || Joseph || 20,058 || 47–20–9–3 || 106 || 
|-

|- align="center" bgcolor="#bbffbb"
| 80 || April 3 || NY Islanders || 2 – 5 || Detroit || || Joseph || 20,058 || 48–20–9–3 || 108 || 
|- align="center" bgcolor="#ffffbb"
| 81 || April 4 || Detroit || 5 – 5 || Columbus || OT || Legace || 18,136 || 48–20–10–3 || 109 || 
|- align="center"
| 82 || April 6 || Detroit || 3 – 4 || Chicago || OT || Joseph || 21,565 || 48–20–10–4 || 110 || 
|-

|-
| Legend:

Playoffs

|- align="center"  bgcolor="#ffbbbb"
| 1 || April 10 || Anaheim || 2 – 1 || Detroit || OT || Joseph || 20,058 || Anaheim leads 1–0 || 
|- align="center"  bgcolor="#ffbbbb"
| 2 || April 12 || Anaheim || 3 – 2 || Detroit || || Joseph || 20,058 || Anaheim leads 2–0 || 
|- align="center"  bgcolor="#ffbbbb"
| 3 || April 14 || Detroit || 1 – 2 || Anaheim || || Joseph || 17,174 || Anaheim leads 3–0 || 
|- align="center"  bgcolor="#ffbbbb"
| 4 || April 16 || Detroit || 2 – 3 || Anaheim || OT || Joseph || 17,174 || Anaheim wins 4–0 || 
|-

|-
| Legend:

Player statistics

Scoring
 Position abbreviations: C = Center; D = Defense; G = Goaltender; LW = Left Wing; RW = Right Wing
  = Joined team via a transaction (e.g., trade, waivers, signing) during the season. Stats reflect time with the Red Wings only.
  = Left team via a transaction (e.g., trade, waivers, release) during the season. Stats reflect time with the Red Wings only.

Goaltending

Awards and records

Awards

Milestones

Transactions
The Red Wings were involved in the following transactions from June 14, 2002, the day after the deciding game of the 2002 Stanley Cup Finals, through June 9, 2003, the day of the deciding game of the 2003 Stanley Cup Finals.

Trades

Players acquired

Players lost

Signings

Draft picks
Detroit's picks at the 2002 NHL Entry Draft at the Air Canada Centre in Toronto. The Red Wings were slated to pick 30th overall but traded their first pick to the Atlanta Thrashers.

Farm teams

Grand Rapids Griffins
The Griffins were Detroit's top affiliate in the American Hockey League in 2002–03.

Toledo Storm
The Storm were the Red Wings' ECHL affiliate for the 2002–03 season.

See also
2002–03 NHL season

Notes

References

Detroit Red Wings seasons
Detroit
Detroit
Detroit Red Wings
Detroit Red Wings